Savannakhet is a province of Laos. The name derives from Savanh Nakhone ('heavenly district' or 'land of fertility suitable for agriculture') the province's original name. It bears the same meaning as Nakhon Sawan, a city in Thailand.

The province is in the southern part of the country and is the largest province in Laos. It borders Khammouane province to the north, Quảng Trị and Thừa Thiên–Huế provinces of Vietnam to the east, Salavan province to the south, and Nakhon Phanom and Mukdahan provinces of Thailand to the west. The Second Thai–Lao Friendship Bridge over the Mekong River connects Mukdahan province in Thailand with Savannakhet in Laos. Its capital, Savannakhet, also known as Kaysone Phomvihane or Muang Khanthabouly is Laos' second most largest city after Vientiane. It forms an important trading post between Thailand and Vietnam.

Along with Bolikhamsai and Khammouane provinces, Savannakhet is one of the main tobacco producing areas of Laos. It has numerous natural resources. Xépôn is the site of the largest mine in Laos, with reserves of copper and gold. During the Iron Age, copper smelting and copper mining was held at the archaeological site Vilabouly Complex.

History
Prehistoric human occupation is evidenced by the first stone tools in the province, dating back between 100,000 and 12,000 years. The first bronze tools date to 2000 BCE. The region was then the center of the Sikhottabong Kingdom. The much-venerated Pha That Sikhottabong stupa is on the grounds of a 19th-century monastery in Thakhek. Sikhottabong was an important kingdom in ancient Indo-China. Other centers of the kingdom were in Viang Chan, Khammuan, Nong Khai, and Udon. Khmer Empire ruins dating to 553 and 700 CE have been found at Heuan Hin.

In the 20th century, Savannakhet province was one of the seats of the struggle for independence. Prime Minister Kaysone Phomvihane originated in the province. The town was bombed and then occupied by Thai armed forces during the Franco-Thai War. During the Vietnam War, the eastern part of the province was crossed by the Ho Chi Minh trail. It was heavily bombed by U.S. forces and loyalists. Some areas are still under the threat of unexploded ordnance. In 2007, the Second Thai–Lao Friendship Bridge was opened across the Mekong from Savannakhet to Mukdahan, Thailand. Many missionaries came here, evidenced by a Catholic church in Savannakhet.

Geography
The province borders Khammouan province to the north, Quảng Trị and Thừa Thiên–Huế provinces of Vietnam to the east, Salavan province to the south, and  Nakhon Phanom and Mukdahan provinces of Thailand to the west. Notable settlements in the province include Savannakhet, Muong Song Khone, Ban Nhiang, Seno, Dong-Hen, Muang Phalan, Ban Sanoun, Muang Phin, Ban Dong, Ban Nammi, Ban Nao Tai.

The Second Thai–Lao Friendship Bridge over the Mekong connects Mukdahan province in Thailand with Savannakhet in Laos.

Protected areas
Areas under protection in the province include Xe Bang Nouan National Biodiversity Conservation Area to the south, Dong Phou Vieng National Protected Area to the southeast, and Phou Xang He National Protected Area to the north. Phou Xang He has rocky mountain ranges, and is known for local Puthai culture. The Dong Phou Vieng is known for its ancient forest with tall vegetation, a sacred lake and That Ing Hang Stupa; there are endangered Eld's deer, silver langurs and hornbills which are rarely found in other reserves.

Administrative divisions
The largest province in Laos is made up of the following 15 districts:

Demographics
The population of this largest province of Laos is 969,697 as of the 2015 census, spread over 15 districts. The ethnic minority groups residing in the province include Lao Loum, Phu Tai, Tai Dam, Katang, Mongkong, Vali, Lavi, Souei, Kapo, Kaleung and Ta Oi. However, in the 2000 census, only three ethnic groups were listed: Lao Loum (Lowland Lao), Phu Tai, and Bru, the only ones recognized by the provincial government. The Bru, however, are a diverse people with various dialects and cultures.

Economy
In the 1980s, Laotians panned for gold here using pieces of shrapnel and aircraft wreckage. Early exploration occurred in 1990 by Australian mining company CRA, which was subsequently awarded a contract. It is now operated, and 90% owned by MMG Limited. Sepon became the country's first significant foreign mining interest when it opened in 2002. Other mining companies operating in the province (2008) include: Wanrong Cement III, Lane Xang Minerals LTD (Vilabuly District), Lane Xang Minerals Ltd (Vilabuly District), Lao State Gypsum Mining Co Ltd (Champhone District), and Savan Gypsum Mining Co. (Champhone District).

Along with Bolikhamsai and Khammouane provinces, it is one of the main tobacco producing areas of Laos.

Landmarks
Apart from the provincial capital, Savannakhet, which is a trading centre opposite to Mukhdahan town in Thailand, other places of interest in the town area are the Roman Catholic Church, a Vietnamese temple and school. Most of the buildings in the town are in the French architectural style of their colonial rule. In the Ban Nonglamchan Village in Champhone District, there is a library which contains a collection of manuscripts written in the Kham-Pali and Lao languages on palm leaves which are stated to be 200 years old. In Ban Tangvay Village of Xonbuly District, fossilized dinosaur bones found in 1930 are exhibited in the Dinosaur Exhibition Hall in Savannakhet. The Ho Chi Minh trail and remnants of American tanks and warplanes are on display in Phin District on Route 9, near the Lao Bao border check post.

Fossil sites
There are five fossil sites in the province. The site was discovered by the geologist Josué Hoffet in 1936 and was explored by a team led by Philippe Taquet from the Muséum national d'histoire naturelle of Paris in the 1990s. He discovered tree fossils (Araucarioxylon hoffetti), turtles, and a sauropod, Tangvayosaurus hoffetti. Aptian age findings include a Psittacosaurus. In Pha Lane, on the banks of the Sê San River, a theropod was discovered.

Museums
Fossils are exhibited in a dinosaur museum in Savannakhet. The Savannakeht Provincial Museum has exhibits of war relics, artillery and inactive UXOs. Their handles imitate basketry. The Dong Son culture is represented by several bronze drums.

Religious sites
The Wat Inghang temple, about 2000 years old, is located in the Ban Thad village. It was built to commemorate a visit of Lord Buddha when he was the guest of King Sumitatham of the Sikhottabong Kingdom. King Saysethathirath had the temple remodeled during 1548. It is approached by Route 9 between Savannakhet and Seno. An annual festival is held here on the first full moon of the lunar calendar.
 
The Wat Xayaphoum temple was built in 1542 in Xayaphoum village on the bank of the Mekong River during the period when Ban Thahir or Nakham temple was built. As the Buddhist centre and largest monastery in Laos, its arts and architecture are dated to the earliest Savannakhet period. The temple has a large garden with ancient trees surrounding it. There is also a workshop near the entrance from the river side where golden Buddha statues are made. Pimai Lao festival is held in the province and boat racing is an important event.

Heuan Hin ("stone house") is a shrine in Ban Dongdokmay. It was built during the Khmer regime in honour of their Sikhottabong Kingdom.

The That Phon Stupa was built during the period of 557 to 700. The festival held here during the first full moon of the lunar calendar marks tribute to Phra Sghiva and some Hindu gods.

St Teresa's Catholic Church is situated in Savannakhet's main square. Built in 1930, it consists of thick masonry walls and an octagonal spire.

References

Sources
 
 
 

 
Provinces of Laos
Populated places on the Mekong River